The Astino Valley is found within the Italian comune of Bergamo in Lombardy.

It is relatively small in size and it is part of the Parco dei Colli di Bergamo system, west of Bergamo.

Religion 
 Astino Abbey is a monastery in the valley.

Valleys of Lombardy